
Year 552 (DLII) was a leap year starting on Monday (link will display the full calendar) of the Julian calendar. The denomination 552 for this year has been used since the early medieval period, when the Anno Domini calendar era became the prevalent method in Europe for naming years.

Events 
 By place 

 Byzantine Empire 
 July 1 – Battle of Taginae: Narses crosses the Apennines with a Byzantine army (25,000 men). He is blocked by a Gothic force under king Totila near Taginae (Central Italy). In a narrow mountain valley, Narses deploys his army in a "crescent shaped" formation. He dismounts his Lombard and Heruli cavalry mercenaries, placing them as a phalanx in the centre. On his left flank he sends out a mixed force of foot and horse archers to seize a dominant height. The Goths open the battle with a determined cavalry charge. Halted by enfilading fire from both sides, the attackers are thrown back in confusion on the infantry behind them. The Byzantine cataphracts (Clibanarii) sweep into the milling mass. More than 6,000 Goths, including Totila, are killed. The remnants flee, and Narses proceeds to Rome, where he captures the city after a brief siege.
 Emperor Justinian I dispatches a small Byzantine force (2,000 men) under Liberius to Hispania, according to the historian Jordanes. He conquers Cartagena and other cities on the southeastern coast. 
 Justinian I receives the first silkworm eggs from two Nestorian monks at Constantinople. They were sent to Central Asia (see 550) and smuggled the precious eggs from China hidden in rods of bamboo.

 Europe 
 Battle of Asfeld: The Lombards under King Audoin defeat the Gepids.
 Cynric, king of Wessex, captures the fortress city of Old Sarum.
 The Roman Catholic Diocese of Meath is established in Ireland.
 Teia becomes the last king of the Ostrogoths in Italy.

 Asia 
 July 11 – First year of the Armenian calendar.
 Yuan Di succeeds Xiao Dong as emperor of the Liang dynasty.
 Bumin Qaghan dies; the new khagan is Issik Qaghan of the Turkic Empire.
 Buddhism in Japan is introduced, according to the Nihon Shoki.

 By topic 
 Religion 
 The Byzantine Church is able to make fabrics, with the intention of developing a large silk industry in the Byzantine Empire.
 Eutychius becomes patriarch of Constantinople.

Births 
 Æthelberht, king (bretwalda) of Kent (approximate date)
 John the Merciful, patriarch of Alexandria (approximate date)

Deaths 
 February 5 – Dacius, archbishop of Milan
 July 1 – Totila, king of the Ostrogoths
 December 13 – Columba of Terryglass, Irish abbot and saint
 Aba I, patriarch of the Church of the East
 Anicius Maximus, Roman patrician
 Aratius, Armenian general 
 Bumin Qaghan, ruler of the Göktürks
 Hou Jing, regent of the Liang dynasty 
 Menas, patriarch of Constantinople
 Turismod, prince of the Lombards
 Wang Wei, chief strategist of the Liang dynasty
 Xiao Dong, emperor of the Liang dynasty
 Xiaojing, emperor of Eastern Wei (b. 524)

References